John Venn, FRS, FSA (4 August 1834 – 4 April 1923) was an English mathematician, logician and philosopher noted for introducing Venn diagrams, which are used in logic, set theory, probability, statistics, and computer science. In 1866, Venn published The Logic of Chance, a groundbreaking book which espoused the frequency theory of probability, arguing that probability should be determined by how often something is forecast to occur as opposed to "educated" assumptions. Venn then further developed George Boole's theories in the 1881 work Symbolic Logic, where he highlighted what would become known as Venn diagrams.

Life and career 
John Venn was born on 4 August 1834 in Kingston upon Hull, Yorkshire, to Martha Sykes and Rev. Henry Venn, who was the rector of the parish of Drypool. His mother died when he was three years old. Venn was descended from a long line of church evangelicals, including his grandfather John Venn. Venn was brought up in a very strict atmosphere at home. His father Henry had played a significant part in the Evangelical movement and he was also the secretary of the Society for Missions to Africa and the East, establishing eight bishoprics overseas. His grandfather was pastor to William Wilberforce of the abolitionist movement, in Clapham.

He began his education in London joining Sir Roger Cholmeley's School, now known as Highgate School, with his brother Henry in September 1846. He moved on to Islington Proprietary School and in October 1853, he went to Gonville and Caius College, Cambridge. In 1857, he obtained his degree in mathematics and became a fellow. In 1903 he was elected President of the College, a post he held until his death. He followed his family vocation and became an Anglican priest, ordained in 1859, serving first at the church in Cheshunt, Hertfordshire, and later in Mortlake, Surrey.

In 1862, he returned to Cambridge as a lecturer in moral science, studying and teaching logic and probability theory, and, beginning around 1869, giving intercollegiate lectures. These duties led to his developing the diagram which would eventually bear his name.

He built rare machines. A certain machine was meant to bowl cricket balls. The machine was so fascinating that when Australian cricketers were visiting Cambridge, the machines were used to entertain their arrival. The bowling machine that Venn built actually bowled out the top ranked player of the team four times consecutively.

In 1868, he married Susanna Carnegie Edmonstone with whom he had one son, John Archibald Venn. His son entered the mathematics field as well.

In 1883, he resigned from the clergy, having concluded that Anglicanism was incompatible with his philosophical beliefs. In that same year, Venn was elected a Fellow of the Royal Society, and in 1884, he was awarded a Sc.D. by Cambridge.

He died on 4 April 1923.

Charity work and a civic presence in the town of Cambridge 
Newspaper archives show that Venn was a very active member of local civic society in Cambridge, and a committee member of the Cambridge Charitable Organisations Society, later elected vice-chairman in December 1884.

Venn was president of the Cambridge Antiquarian Society in 1908–1909. He is also listed as a vice president of the Cambridge Provident Medical Institution.

Venn was a prominent supporter of votes for women. He co-signed with his wife Susanna, a letter to the Cambridge Independent Press published 16 October 1908, encouraging women to put themselves forward as candidates for the up-and-coming Cambridge town council elections. The letter was co-sponsored by Lady Maud Darwin, wife of Sir George Darwin, and Florence Ada Keynes.

The newspaper archives reveal that Venn was also a passionate gardener, regularly taking part in local competitions organised by groups such as the Cambridgeshire Horticultural Society, winning prizes for his roses in July 1885 and for his white carrots later that September.

Memorials 
 In 2017 The Drypool Bridge in Hull was decorated with intersecting circles, in honour of Venn and an unofficial ‘blue  plaque’  is installed near the same location on Clarence Street.
 Venn is commemorated at the University of Hull by the Venn Building. 
 A stained glass window in the dining hall of Gonville and Caius College, Cambridge, commemorates Venn's work.
 In commemoration of the 180th anniversary of Venn's birth, on 4 August 2014, Google replaced its normal logo on global search pages with an interactive and animated Google doodle that incorporated the use of a Venn diagram.
 Venn Street in Clapham, London, which was the home of his grandfather, shows a Venn diagram on the street sign.

Publications 
Venn compiled Alumni Cantabrigienses, a biographical register of former members of the University of Cambridge. His other works include:

 
 
 
 .  Two further editions were published.

References

External links 

 A Cambridge Alumni Database
 The Venn archives clarify the confusing timeline of the various Venns.
 Obituary of John Venn (New York Times)
 Portrait of Venn by Charles Brock, and a link to a site about Venn
 Another (clearer) view of the Venn stained glass window
 

1834 births
1923 deaths
Mathematicians from Kingston upon Hull
People educated at Highgate School
Alumni of Gonville and Caius College, Cambridge
19th-century philosophers
English mathematicians
English logicians
19th-century English Anglican priests
English philosophers
Fellows of Gonville and Caius College, Cambridge
Fellows of the Royal Society
People associated with the University of Hull
Clapham Sect
Fellows of the Society of Antiquaries of London
People educated at Islington Proprietary School